Julie Cook (born 8 March 1954) is a former England and Great Britain field hockey goalkeeper.

She joined the England team in 1980 as a reserve goalie to Pauline Gibbon, and became actual goalie when Gibbon retired in 1985.  She also played for her county, Suffolk. After her Olympic career, Cook finally ended her playing career because of injury

and served as a PE teacher at the Harwich School until her retirement in 2009.

References

External links
 

1954 births
Living people
Field hockey players at the 1988 Summer Olympics
Olympic field hockey players of Great Britain
British female field hockey players
English female field hockey players
Female field hockey goalkeepers